Seamless may refer to:

 Seamless (company), an online food ordering company
 "Seamless", a 2015 song by Sabrina Carpenter from Eyes Wide Open
 "Seamless", a song by American Head Charge from the 1999 album Trepanation and the 2001 album The War of Art
 Seamless branching, a DVD technology
 Seamless garment, an abortion-related phrase referencing Jesus' robe
 Seamless Garment Network, an anti-abortion organization founded in 1987
 Seamless robe of Jesus, the robe said to have been worn by Jesus during (or shortly before) his crucifixion
 Seamless Rate Adaptation, ITU G.992.3/4, a telecommunication standard
 Seamless3d modelling, open source 3D modeling software

See also
Seam (disambiguation)
Seemless